Sir John Kennedy-Good  (8 August 1915 – 11 July 2005) was a New Zealand politician. He was mayor of Lower Hutt from 1970 to 1986.

Biography

Early life and career
Kennedy-Good was born in 1915 in Goulburn, New South Wales, where his father was working as a stock and station agent. The family later moved to Invercargill, New Zealand, where they ran a butcher's shop. Kennedy-Good was educated at Southland Boys' High School and graduated from the University of Otago with a Bachelor of Dental Surgery in 1940.

In 1940, he opened a dental practice in Lower Hutt and married June Clement Mackay, with whom he would have seven children. He served as president of the Wellington branch of the New Zealand Dental Association in 1950 and chair of the Dental Health Council in 1952.

Political career
Kennedy-Good became involved in local politics through the issue of fluoridation of Lower Hutt's water supply, which he supported, and was first elected to the Lower Hutt City Council in 1962. He was appointed mayor in 1970 following the death of incumbent Percy Dowse, and was re-elected to that post at the next five local-body elections, retiring in 1986.

He twice stood unsuccessfully as the National Party candidate for the New Zealand parliament in the Hutt electorate: in the 1966 general election against Walter Nash; and against Trevor Young in the  following Nash's death.

Kennedy-Good was appointed a Companion of the Queen's Service Order for public services in the 1977 Queen's Silver Jubilee and Birthday Honours, and a Knight Commander of the Order of the British Empire, for service to local government and the community, in the 1983 New Year Honours. The Kennedy-Good Bridge in Lower Hutt is named in his honour.

Later life and death
In retirement, Kennedy-Good lived at Pauanui and later Whangaparaoa. He died in Auckland in 2005 and was buried at Christ Church Cemetery in Taitā.

References

1915 births
2005 deaths
People from Goulburn
Australian emigrants to New Zealand
People educated at Southland Boys' High School
University of Otago alumni
New Zealand dentists
Mayors of Lower Hutt
New Zealand National Party politicians
Companions of the Queen's Service Order
New Zealand Knights Commander of the Order of the British Empire
Unsuccessful candidates in the 1966 New Zealand general election
Wellington Harbour Board members
Hutt City Councillors
20th-century dentists